Chondrodysplasia punctata is a clinically and genetically diverse group of rare diseases, first described by Erich Conradi (1882–1968), that share the features of stippled epiphyses and skeletal changes.

Types 
 X-linked recessive chondrodysplasia punctata 
Conradi–Hünermann syndrome (chondrodysplasia punctata 2, x-linked dominant) 
 Autosomal dominant chondrodysplasia punctata

See also 
 List of cutaneous conditions
 List of radiographic findings associated with cutaneous conditions

References

External links 

Genodermatoses